is a professional Go player and author of several books on Go.

Biography 
By the time he was 8, Ishida started learning Go. He was a student at the legendary Kitani Minoru go school. Famous along with his fellow students Cho Chikun, Kobayashi Koichi, Kato Masao, and Takemiya Masaki. He joined the dojo at a young age like his fellow students. He became a professional in 1963 when he was 15. His dan rank grew quickly because of the Oteai. He would go up the ranks faster than rules allowed after winning the first 14 Oteai games when he was being promoted from 6 to 7 dan. He reached 9 dan in 11 years, faster than most other players do. Ishida was given the nickname "The Computer" because his Yose play and counting skills were far more accurate than other pros.

Promotion record

Titles and runners-up 
Ranks #9-t in total number of titles in Japan.

Honors
Medal with Purple Ribbon (2016)

References

1948 births
Japanese Go players
Go (game) writers
Living people
People from Kiyosu
Sportspeople from Aichi Prefecture
Recipients of the Medal with Purple Ribbon